Pulitzer Prize Playhouse is an American television anthology drama series which offered adaptations of Pulitzer Prize-winning plays, novels, and stories. The distinguished journalist Elmer Davis was the host and narrator of this 1950-1952 ABC series.

Sponsor 
Sponsored by Milwaukee's Joseph Schlitz Brewing Company, the 60-minute show opened with theme music by Bernard Green. Columbia University's Pulitzer School of Journalism, which made the annual Pulitzer awards, benefited from its agreement with Schlitz and ABC, receiving $100,000 from Schlitz for its cooperation. However, the show made no mention of Columbia or the Pulitzer School of Journalism.

Productions and performers

Plays in the first season included You Can't Take It with You (the initial telecast), The Magnificent Ambersons and Our Town. The second season productions included Ah, Wilderness and The Skin of Our Teeth. Actors in these shows included Spring Byington, Charles Dingle, James Dunn, Nina Foch, John Forsythe, Helen Hayes, Wanda Hendrix, Wright King, Otto Kruger, Joan McCracken, Thomas Mitchell, Mildred Natwick, Gene Raymond, Kent Smith and Fredd Wayne. Lighting design was by Imero Fiorentino. The announcer was Nelson Case.

A brewing problem
The series began October 6, 1950, and a month later it came under criticism from the Woman's Christian Temperance Union, which objected to the tie-in between Schlitz and the Pulitzer Prize. Mrs. D. Leigh Colvin, president of the WCTU, suggested that Columbia should return the $100,000, stating that the program was "a scheme of education for alcoholism which uses American classics as a springboard for beer promotion. The tie-up... allies the university, its school and the Pulitzer name with programs which are obviously put on by the brewer to promote drinking in the American home. Beer bottles and beer drinking have been rampant in commercials between acts, one recent commercial depicting Mona Lisa coming to life from her painting to reach for a glass of the sponsor's beer."

Dean Carl W. Ackerman of the Pulitzer School responded, "This has been a pioneering development in the relationship between industry and education. It is raising the standards of entertainment in American homes. Any development which contributes to the improvement of home life is wholesome because the home is the bulwark of democracy."

Schlitz president Erwin C. Uilein pointed out that Vassar College was founded in 1861 by Matthew Vassar who had made a fortune in his Poughkeepsie, New York brewery.

Graphic design and formats
The opening title card displayed a painted design of comedy/tragedy masks with a quill pen positioned in the mouth of the tragedy mask. Advertising for the series also used comedy/tragedy masks but in a more simplified line-art version minus the quill pen.

The series was telecast live, but in some areas it was shown two weeks later as captured on kinescope film. It initially presented hour-long dramas from October 1950 to June 1951; the series was reduced to a 30-minute format from December 1951 to June 1952. During the second season, the series alternated with Celanese Theater. Pulitzer Prize Playhouse continued until June 4, 1952, producing a total of 53 episodes.

Awards and nominations

Episodes

References

External links
 Classic Themes
 

1950 American television series debuts
1952 American television series endings
1950s American anthology television series
American Broadcasting Company original programming
1950s American drama television series
Black-and-white American television shows
English-language television shows
Primetime Emmy Award for Outstanding Drama Series winners
Pulitzer Prizes